Parelliptis scytalias is a moth in the family Lecithoceridae. It was described by Edward Meyrick in 1910. It is found in Sri Lanka.

The forewings are whitish ochreous, with some scattered fuscous or dark fuscous specks and with the costal edge dark fuscous towards the base. The discal stigmata are blackish. There is a rather dark fuscous streak along the dorsum from one-fourth to three-fourths, broad in the middle and narrowed to the extremities. The posterior area from the second discal stigma is pale ochreous suffused with fuscous except towards the costa, undefined anteriorly, darker fuscous towards the termen. The hindwings are grey, paler anteriorly.

References

Moths described in 1910
Parelliptis